Alfred Bourne (1894–1939) was an English footballer who played as a goalkeeper for Port Vale between 1919 and 1922.

Career
Bourne joined Port Vale in the summer of 1919. He quickly established himself as the first choice goalkeeper, however he lost his place by October 1920. He was a member of the sides that won the Staffordshire Senior Cup and shared the North Staffordshire Infirmary Cup in 1920. He proved himself superior to Jonathan Hammond and played 32 Second Division games in the 1919–20 season. However, he only featured ten times in the league in the 1920–21 campaign, as new signing Walter Smith was preferred. Bourne played 13 matches in the 1921–22 season, as he battled with Smith, Teddy Peers and Ernest Blackham for a first team place. Peers won the battle, and Bourne was released from The Old Recreation Ground at the end of the season.

Career statistics
Source:

Honours
Port Vale
Staffordshire Senior Cup: 1920

References

1894 births
1939 deaths
Sportspeople from Newcastle-under-Lyme
English footballers
Association football goalkeepers
Port Vale F.C. players
English Football League players